is a Japanese  manga series written and illustrated by Takehiko Itō. It was originally published monthly in the Shueisha magazine V-Jump starting in 1993.

A 52-episode anime television adaptation of the series was produced by Sunrise, directed by Toshifumi Kawase, and aired in Japan from April 5, 1994 to March 28, 1995. It also gained two OVA series comprising 17 episodes total, as well as two video games.

Plot
Ryū Knight tells the story of Adeu, a boy who lives his life by the "Ethos of Chivalry" (a code of conduct similar to the Knightly Virtues). He is on a quest to seek the Earth's Blade, a gigantic sword which is capable of reaching the sky from the ground. Along the way, he meets Paffy, who is a princess, and her two escorts: Sarutobi, a ninja, and Izumi, a priest. Together, they partake on an adventurous journey in which he comes across many villains, at first composed of thieves and bandits who are after the Ryu mechs, which are far stronger than the normal mechs (henceforth referred to as Solids). The plot expands as the series progresses.

Characters and their Ryū Units
Adeu Waltham: Ryū Knight Zephyr; with Spirit Stone, class-changes to Ryū Paladin Lord Zephyr
Sarutobi: Ryū Ninja Bakuretsumaru; with Spirit Stone, class-changes to Ryū Ninja Master Bakuretsumaru
Izumi: Ryū Priest Baurus; with Spirit Stone, class-changes to Ryū High Priest Baurus
Paffy: Ryū Mage Magidora; with Spirit Stone, class-changes to Ryū Wizard Magidora
Katze: Ryū Gunner Derringer (also spelled as Delingar), class-changes to Ryū Wyatt Derringer
Hittel: Ryū Gunner Derringer (both Katze and Hittel, as brother and sister, can control Derringer), class-changes to Ryū Wyatt Derringer
Gesshin: Ryū Samurai Hayatemaru; class-changes to Ryū Kaiden Hayatemaru
Gratches: Ryū Chief Shinebaram; class-changes to Ryū Grand Chief Shinebaram
Galden: Dark Knight Steru; class-changes to Rune Knight Steru

Songs

TV Version
Opening themes:
"Good-bye Tears" by Yumiko Takahashi (episodes 1–28)
"RUN ~Kyou ga Kawaru Magic~" (Run 〜今日が変わるMagic〜) by Hitomi Mieno (episodes 29–52)
Ending themes:
"Hitomi ni Diamond" (瞳にDiamond) by Hitomi Mieno (episodes 1–28)
"Owaranai Natsu" (終わらない季節(なつ)) by Hitomi Mieno (episodes 29–52)

Adeu's Legend
Opening theme:
"Wing of Wind" (風の翼) by Hitomi Mieno
Ending theme:
"Point 1" (ポイント1) by Yumiko Takahashi

Adeu's Legend II
Ending theme:
"Yume ni Stay" (夢にSTAY) by Hitomi Mieno

Media

Manga
The original manga was created by Takehiko Itō and was serialized monthly in Shueisha's V-Jump beginning in 1993. A total of three tankōbon chapter collections released in Japan from 1994 to 1995. Although no official English translation exists, the manga was published in Spanish by Planeta DeAgostini
and in Italian by Planet Manga.

Anime
The 52-episode Haō Taikei Ryū Knight anime adaptation was produced by Sunrise and aired on TV Tokyo from April 22, 1994 to March 28, 1995. The anime was released in an official DVD box set by Bandai Visual.

OVAs
Three OVAs were produced by Sunrise during and after the airing of the television series. They were:
 , was released in 13 episodes from July 21, 1994 to September 25, 1995.
<ul>

Video game
Two video games related to the series were released:
, an RPG developed by Japan Art Media and published by Bandai for the Super Famicom in 1994.
, an action point-and-click adventure game developed by Emotion Digital Software and published by Bandai for Mac OS and Windows in 1995.

References

External links
Haō Taikei Ryū Knight at Sunrise 

 Road of Paladin at MobyGames
 Road of Paladin at GameFAQs

1993 manga
1994 anime OVAs
1994 anime television series debuts
1995 anime OVAs
1996 anime OVAs
Bandai Namco franchises
Fantasy anime and manga
Shōnen manga
Shueisha franchises
Sunrise (company)
Super robot anime and manga